Earl of Ely is a title that has been created three times in the Peerage of Ireland for members of the Loftus family. This family descended from Nicholas Loftus, 1st Viscount Loftus, who was raised to the Peerage of Ireland as Baron Loftus, of Loftus Hall in the County of Wexford, in 1751. In 1756 he was further honoured when he was made Viscount Loftus, of Ely in the County of Wicklow. He was succeeded by his son, Nicholas, the second Viscount. He had previously represented Fethard in the Irish House of Commons. In 1766 he was created Earl of Ely in the Peerage of Ireland. Lord Ely assumed the additional surname of Hume. He was succeeded by his son, Nicholas, the second Earl. He represented both Fethard and Bannow in the Irish Parliament.

The earldom became extinct on his early death in 1769 while he was succeeded in the barony and viscountcy by his uncle, Henry, the fourth Viscount. He represented Bannow and County Wexford in the Irish House of Commons. In 1771 the earldom was revived when he was created Earl of Ely in the Peerage of Ireland. However, all three titles became extinct on his death in 1783. He devised his estates to his nephew Charles Tottenham, who assumed the surname of Loftus in lieu of his patronymic and was created Baron Loftus in 1789, Viscount Loftus in 1789, Earl of Ely in 1794 and Marquess of Ely in 1800. See the latter title for more information on these peerages. 

The title refers to Ely in County Wicklow, not to the English city of Ely, Cambridgeshire; the second syllable is pronounced to rhyme with "lie" rather than "lee" (and so the title is pronounced in the same way as the first name Eli).

Viscounts Loftus (1756)
Nicholas Loftus, 1st Viscount Loftus (–1763)
Nicholas Hume-Loftus, 2nd Viscount Loftus (died 1766) (created Earl of Ely in 1766)

Earls of Ely; first creation (1766)
Nicholas Hume-Loftus, 1st Earl of Ely (died 1766)
Nicholas Hume-Loftus, 2nd Earl of Ely (1738–1769)

Viscounts Loftus (1756; reverted)
Henry Loftus, 4th Viscount Loftus (1709–1783) (created Earl of Ely in 1771)

Earls of Ely; second creation (1771)
Henry Loftus, 1st Earl of Ely (1709–1783)

See also
Marquess of Ely

References

Earldoms in the Peerage of Ireland
Extinct earldoms in the Peerage of Ireland
Noble titles created in 1766
Noble titles created in 1771
Noble titles created in 1794
Loftus family